Victor M. Richel, is an American banking executive and philanthropist born on May 7, 1938, in Elizabeth, New Jersey.  He is the current chairman of the board of trustees at both Trinitas Health and Trinitas Regional Medical Center, as well as chairman of the board of trustees at Union College, New Jersey.  In 2000, he founded the Richel Family Foundation  with his wife Andrea.

Education
Richel completed his undergraduate studies at Villanova University in 1960. He then pursued additional studies in marketing and executive development at both Columbia University and Harvard University.

Early career 
Richel was the chairman of the board and chief executive officer of Statewide Savings Bank.  He went on to become chief executive officer and chairman of the board at Statewide Financial Corporation.
 
In 1996, Richel was appointed to the Banking Advisory Board of the New Jersey Department of Banking and Insurance, after a nomination by Governor Christine Todd Whitman.
 
Richel has also served on the board of Thrift Institutions Community Investment Corporation of New Jersey (TICIC), as well as the Board of the New Jersey Savings League.
 
Richel then went on to become the Vice Chairman of the Board at Independence Community Bank Corporation prior to its sale to Sovereign Bank in June 2006.

He served as a senior officer of NUI Corp / Elizabethtown Gas Company.

Current affiliations
Richel is the chairman of the board of Trinitas Health and Trinitas Regional Medical Center. and the chairman of the board of trustees of Union College.  
 
Richel is the chairman, president & CEO of Dominion Partners, a financial investment, real estate partnership, and consulting organization that provides consultation to banks and companies throughout the world.
 
Additionally, he serves as chairman of Westminster Properties, a development company and licensed as a New Jersey new home builder and property management group as well as Richel Commercial Brokerage.
 
Richel was nominated to the board of trustees at the Common Sense Institute of New Jersey in 2013. and previously served as chairman of the Board of Directors of Metuchen Savings Bank.

Civic activity
Richel is the chairman of the board of trustees, and member of the board of governors at Union College.  He is also the chairman of the board of trustees at Trinitas Health and Trinitas Regional Medical Center (formerly known as Trinitas Hospital), as well as the past chairman and President of the Friends of the Child Advocacy Center of Union County.
 
Richel also serves on the board of Elizabethtown Healthcare Foundation. He is a member of the Two Hundred Club of Union County and the Union County Crime Stoppers.
 
Previously, he served as a trustee at the Garden State Cancer Center, as well as, Pace University’s Lubin School of Business, the  St. Peter's College Board of Regents and John Cabot University in Rome.

He was Chairman of the Alexian Brothers Hospital of Elizabeth, and served as a member of the Board of Elizabeth General Medical Center.

Richel Family Foundation
The Richel Family Foundation is a charitable organization founded by Richel and his wife Andrea.  The foundation's goals are to support the socio-economic needs of the citizens within Union County and New Jersey.  Their children and their spouses: Sue and Ed Marchelitis, Dave and Heather Richel, and John and Kim Richel are members and trustees of the Foundation.

Honors and awards
 Recipient of the Ellis Island Medal of Honor in 1999 
 2003 Christopher Columbus Humanitarian 2003  
 2011 Trinitas School of Nursing dedicates floor in honor  
 Recipient of the Caritas Award presented by the Sisters of Charity of Saint Elizabeth 
 2016 Ronald D. Winthers Community College Trustee Leadership Award by the New Jersey Council of County Colleges.
 Named Alexian Brothers Hospital Man of the Year 
 In 2006, Union County College dedicated the Victor M. Richel Student Commons 
 Named 2018 NJHA Hospital Trustee of the Year 
 In 2020, Trinitas Regional Medical Center dedicated the Victor M. Richel Conference Center 
 In 2021, Mr. Richel received the Association of Community College Trustees (ACCT) NORTHEAST REGION Trustee Leadership Award

References

External links 
 Official Website Trinitas Hospital
 Official Website Union County College

American chief executives of financial services companies
Living people
Villanova University alumni
Columbia Business School alumni
Harvard Business School alumni
1938 births